The Crime at Lock 14 (Fr. Le Charretier de la Providence, "The Carter of the Providence")  is a detective novel by the Belgian writer Georges Simenon featuring his character Inspector Jules Maigret.

Plot summary
Maigret is called to a crime scene at Lock 14 on the Marne Canal, near Dizy, when a woman's body is found in the stable of a canalside inn. She had been strangled, and was still wearing her jewellery, pointing to a crime of passion. The woman is identified as Mary Lampson, wife of an English "milord" travelling through France on his yacht, the Southern Cross. Lampson and his odd collection of passengers are questioned, but Maigret comes no nearer to the truth. Also under suspicion are the crew of the barge Providence, particularly its carter, who had spent the night in the stable, possibly on the night of the murder. He turns out to be a simple soul, incapable of harm. When a second member of the Southern Cross's party is murdered, Maigret has to uncover the secrets of all concerned, including the mild-mannered carter of the Providence.

Background
Simenon was fond of boats and spent six months in 1928 navigating the rivers and canals of France. "The carter of la providence" was one of several novels written on board his boat, the Ostrogoth.

"I had my second boat built at Fecamp, the Ostrogoth. I brought it to Paris, where I had it christened (on a whim) by a priest at Notre Dame...then Belgium, Holland, Germany".

Other titles
The book has been translated three times into English: in 1934 by Anthony Abbot as The Crime at Lock 14, in 1963 by Robert Baldick as Maigret meets a Milord (reissued in 2003 as Lock 14), and in 2014 by David Coward as The Carter of 'La Providence'''.

Adaptations
The story has been adapted four times for film and television: in English in 1963 as The Crime at Lock 14, with Rupert Davies in the main role; in Japanese in 1978 as Keishi to Minami Jūjisei ("the Southern Cross") with Kinya Aikawa; in French in 1980 as Le Charretier de "La Providence" with Jean Richard, and again in 2001 as Maigret et la croqueuse de diamants ("Maigret and the gold-diggers (lit. "diamond eaters")", with Bruno Cremer.

Notes

References
 Georges Simenon The Carter of "la Providence"'' 1931; translated D Coward 2014 Penguin Classics, London

External links

 Maigret at trussel.com

1931 Belgian novels
Belgian novels adapted into films
Maigret novels
Novels set in France
Novels set in the 20th century